NGC 3455 is an intermediate spiral galaxy located 65 million light-years away in the constellation of Leo. It is a member of the NGC 3370 Group of galaxies, which is a member of the Leo II Groups, a series of galaxies and galaxy clusters strung out from the right edge of the Virgo Supercluster.

Gallery

References

External links
 

Intermediate spiral galaxies
3455
Leo (constellation)
17840321
032767